The 2020 IFMAR 1:12 scale Electric On-Road World Championships is the 2020 IFMAR World Championships for 1:12 radio-controlled pan car sanctioned by the International Federation of Model Auto Racing (IFMAR). It was run over two separate classes (Stock and Modified) over five days from 8 to 12 January. With two days practice followed by two days qualifying with the finals for both classes on the final day.

The national sanctioning body, British Radio Car Association (BRCA), acted as the host nation on behalf of the European Federation of Radio Operated Model Automobiles (EFRA), with the championship taking place at Middleton Hall, Centre:MK in city of Milton Keynes which is Buckinghamshire.

Venue/Circuit 

The IFMAR Worlds takes place at the Middleton Hall of Centre:MK which acts as event space. The centre has, in the past, hosted radio-controlled racing events there in the past few years. This includes the only 1:12 scale Reedy International Race of Champions in 2016, an unofficial GT12 world championship event the following year, British Off Road Grand Prix for 1:10 electric off-road and rounds of BRCA 1:12 National Championship.

All those events along with the IFMAR Worlds takes place on a temporary circuit, running on carpet. The organisers hosted a trades show and run various initiatives to increase awareness. This different from all previous championships which were hosted by established clubs.

The racing surface was Track GT carpet measuring approx. 35M x 16M with track markings being square white tube, carpet overlay and apex markings.

Results

Modified

Stock

References
 Citations

External links 

 

IFMAR 1:12 Electric Track World Championship
International sports competitions hosted by the United Kingdom